This article is about the particular significance of the year 1928 to Wales and its people.

Incumbents

Archbishop of Wales – Alfred George Edwards, Bishop of St Asaph
Archdruid of the National Eisteddfod of Wales 
Elfed (outgoing)
Pedrog (incoming)

Events
29 March – The Grwyne Fawr reservoir is completed in the Brecon Beacons by the Abertillery & District Water Board, 16 years after the start of construction (work having been interrupted by World War I).
12 June – The Welsh National War Memorial is unveiled in Cardiff by The Prince of Wales.
18 June – Amelia Earhart lands near Burry Port, becoming the first woman passenger on a Transatlantic flight.
December – Rapallo House, Llandudno, is handed over to the local council to be used as a museum, as a bequest from Francis Edouard Chardon.
unknown dates
Dr John Williams establishes a hospital at Durtlang in the Lushai Hills (Mizoram) of India.
The Campaign for the Protection of Rural Wales is founded by Clough Williams-Ellis.
The community of Benedictine monks leaves Caldey Island for Prinknash Abbey. They are replaced at Caldey by a Cistercian order in 1929.
Douglas Cochrane, 12th Earl of Dundonald, buys Gwrych Castle for £78,000.
The Cardiff Station Orchestra, predecessor of the BBC National Orchestra of Wales, is formed.
Brynmawr Experiment begins.

Arts and literature
October – Eric Gill and members of his artistic community leave Capel-y-ffin for Speen, Buckinghamshire.
Sir William Llewellyn is the first Welshman to become President of the Royal Academy of Arts.

Awards

National Eisteddfod of Wales (held in Treorchy)
National Eisteddfod of Wales: Chair – withheld
National Eisteddfod of Wales: Crown – Caradog Prichard

New books

English language
Dorothy Edwards – Winter Sonata
Hilda Vaughan – The Invader: a tale of adventure and passion

Welsh language
Moelona – Breuddwydion Myfanwy
T. H. Parry-Williams – Ysgrifau
Iorwerth Peate – Y Cawg Aur
Richard Thomas – David Williams, y Piwritan

Music
David Evans – Incidental music for Alcestis (unpublished)

Film
The Truth Game, starring Ivor Novello

Broadcasting
Isaac J. Williams presents Travel Talks on Art

Sport
Badminton – The Welsh Badminton Union is formed.
Boxing – Welsh Bantamweight champion Tosh Powell dies after a fight with Billy Housego in Liverpool.
Football – The 1928 Welsh Cup Final is contested by Bangor and Cardiff City at Farrar Road Stadium, Bangor, and ends in a 2–0 victory for Cardiff.
Yachting – The North Wales Cruising Club is formed.

Births
2 January – Dai Royston Bevan, rugby player (d. 2008)
1 February – Sam Edwards, physicist (d. 2015)
8 February – Osian Ellis, harpist (d. 2021)
9 February – Gruffydd Evans, Baron Evans of Claughton, solicitor and politician (d. 1992)
6 March – Glyn Owen, actor (d. 2004)
9 April – Albert Gubay, businessman (d. 2016)
27 April
Selwyn Hughes, clergyman and writer (d. 2006)
Hubert Rees, television character actor (d. 2009)
7 June – Dave Bowen, football player and manager (d. 1995)
9 June – R. Geraint Gruffydd, academic and theologian (d. 2015)
19 June – Ray Powell, politician (d. 2001)
11 July – Greville Janner, Labour MP and lawyer (d. 2015)
14 July – Haydn Morris, international rugby union player (d. 2021)
26 July – Bernice Rubens, novelist (d. 2004)
7 August – Gwilym Roberts, politician (d. 2018)
12 August – Roy Davies, cricketer (d. 2013)
14 August – Sid Judd, Wales international rugby union player (d. 1959)
1 September – Emrys James, actor (d. 1989)
17 September – Dafydd Orwig, educationist (d. 1996)
23 October – Keith Jones, footballer (d. 2007)
20 November – John Disley, distance runner (d. 2016)
19 December – Gwyn Rowlands, rugby union international (d. 2010)

Deaths
11 January – Joseph Bailey, 2nd Baron Glanusk, 63
21 March – Stanley L. Wood, illustrator, 61/2
14 April – Lewis Cobden Thomas, Wales international rugby player, 62
13 May – David John Thomas (Afan), composer and conductor, 47
19 May – Arthur Charles Fox-Davies, heraldry expert (of Welsh descent), 57
23 May – Henry Seymour Berry, 1st Baron Buckland, industrialist, 50 (head injury)
3 June – Tosh Powell, Welsh champion boxer, 20
21 June – Marie Novello, pianist, c. 30 (emphysema)
23 July – John Hinds, businessman and politician, 65
23 August – Daniel Davies, Bishop of Bangor, 64
30 August – Hugh Evan-Thomas, admiral, 65
6 September – Richard Ellis, librarian, 62
1 October – Lawrence Hugh Jenkins, judge, 70
3 December – Isaac Hughes (Craigfryn), poet and novelist, 76
13 December – Harry Jarman, Wales and British Lions international rugby union player, 34–35
29 December – George Boots, rugby player, 54
date unknown – John Morgan Howell, local politician in Cardiganshire, 72/3

See also
1928 in Northern Ireland

References

Wales